Seyed Mohammad Faghie , (born 10 April 1942) was an Iranian Ayatollah. He was chosen by Ruhollah Khomeini as the Imam of Friday Prayer in Neyriz from the Iranian Revolution until his death. He represented the people of Fars province in the Assembly of Experts in the second and fifth terms. He died while in office during the fifth term.

See also 

 List of Ayatollahs
 List of members in the Second Term of the Council of Experts
 List of members in the Fifth Term of the Council of Experts

References 

1942 births
2022 deaths
People from Fars Province
Iranian politicians
Iranian ayatollahs
Members of the Assembly of Experts